The Long Island State Parkway Police is a defunct New York State law enforcement agency that once patrolled state parks and parkways on Long Island, New York.

History 
After the New York State Park Commission was first created in 1902, New York State Police had responsibility for patrolling parks and parkways. In 1946, Long Island State Park Commission President Robert Moses created the Long Island State Park Police Department to patrol Long Island’s parks. Throughout its existence, the force was strongly identified with Moses, the so-called "master builder," and provided his chauffeurs and bodyguards.

In 1950, the name of the agency was changed to the Long Island State Parkway Police to reflect its added responsibility of patrolling the parkways in addition to the parks.

Dissolution 
In 1980, with Moses's power broken, the New York State legislature passed legislation giving the New York State Police responsibility for the state parkways, while the New York State Park Police maintained responsibility for the parks. Officers of the Long Island State Parkway Police were given the option of transferring to either the State Police or the State Park Police.

Headquartered at Belmont Lake State Park in North Babylon, the New York State Park Police currently patrols  of parkland in Nassau and Suffolk Counties.

Fallen officers 
During the existence of the Long Island State Parkway Police Department, two officers died in the line of duty.

See also 

 List of law enforcement agencies in New York
 List of Long Island law enforcement agencies

References

External links 
 The Long Island State Parkway Police

Defunct state law enforcement agencies of the United States
Defunct law enforcement agencies of New York (state)
Government agencies established in 1902
1902 establishments in New York (state)
1980 disestablishments in New York (state)
Long Island